Carrier Airborne Early Warning Squadron 127 (VAW-127), nicknamed  the "Seabats", was an aviation unit of the United States Navy in service from 1983 to 1991. The squadron was equipped with the Grumman E-2C Hawkeye and was assigned only to Carrier Air Wing 13 (CVW-13) on the aircraft carrier .

Squadron History

The Seabats were established on 2 September 1983 as part of the Reagan-era build-up to a 600-ship Navy (to include as many as 15 aircraft carrier battle groups (CVBG). VAW-127 sailed with CVW-13 and USS Coral Sea until the end of the Cold War and subsequent drawdown of the Services which lead  to the Coral Sea/CVW-13 team being one of the first units to be decommissioned. VAW-127 was soon decommissioned on 30 September 1991. In between, the Seabats participated in several noteworthy events to include Operation Eldorado Canyon, the strike conducted against Libya on April 15 1986 and operations in the Gulf of Sidra. VAW-127 was the recipient of the Naval Air Force Atlantic (AIRLANT) Battle Efficiency (Battle “E”) award for 1989.

References

See also
History of the United States Navy
List of inactive United States Navy aircraft squadrons
List of United States Navy aircraft squadrons

Early warning squadrons of the United States Navy